Patrick O'Driscoll (born 1927) was an Irish Gaelic footballer who played as a right corner-back at senior level for the Cork county team. He was named in the "Cork Football Team of the Millennium" in January 2000.

O'Driscoll joined the team during the 1950 championship and was a regular member of the starting fifteen until his retirement a decade later. During that time he won two National League medals and two Munster medals, however, he never won an All-Ireland winners' medal. 

O'Driscoll had a lengthy career with the Russell Rovers and Garda club teams.

In retirement from playing O'Driscoll served as an administrator with the Cork County Board and was also a selector when Cork won the All-Ireland in 1973.

References

 

1927 births
Living people
Cork County Board administrators
Cork inter-county Gaelic footballers
Cork inter-county hurlers
Dual players
Gaelic football selectors
Garda Gaelic footballers
Garda (Cork) Gaelic footballers
Garda Síochána officers
Kerry inter-county hurlers
Munster inter-provincial Gaelic footballers
Russell Rovers Gaelic footballers
Russell Rovers hurlers